The intercostal veins are a group of veins which drain the area between the ribs ("costae"), called the intercostal space.

They can be divided as follows:
 Anterior intercostal veins
 Posterior intercostal veins
 Posterior intercost vein that drain into the Supreme intercostal vein - 1st intercostal space
 Posterior intercost veins that drain into the Superior intercostal vein - 2nd, 3rd, and 4th intercostal spaces. The superior intercostal vein then drains into the Azygous vein.
 Posterior intercost veins that drain directly into the Azygous vein - in spaces 5-11.
 Subcostal vein -- below bottom (12th) rib and also drains into the Azygous vein.

See also
 Intercostal nerves

External links
 
 http://www.instantanatomy.net/thorax/vessels/vinsuperiormediastinum.html

Veins of the torso